Washington Eduardo Tais Videgaín (born 21 December 1972) is a Uruguayan former professional footballer who played as a right back.

Club career
Born in Montevideo, Tais' debuts in professional football were made with local giants C.A. Peñarol, which he helped to five consecutive Primera División titles, the last three as an undisputed starter and where the player scored all his 24 league goals.

In the 1997 summer Tais moved to Spain, where he would remain until his retirement. He started at Racing de Santander, being first-choice during his four-year spell which was always spent in La Liga – although the last season ended in relegation.

Subsequently, Tais signed for Real Betis, where constant injuries and loss of form made him miss nearly 30 games per season. In the 2004–05 campaign he appeared in 11 matches in the league, and also helped the Andalusians to the Copa del Rey, although he was not named for their victory over CA Osasuna in the final;

On 27 January 2011, after more than five years out of football, 38-year-old Tais returned to professional football, signing with first club Danubio FC. He retired at the end of the following season, after a spell with Miramar Misiones in the Uruguayan Segunda División.

International career
Tais made 18 appearances for Uruguay during seven years, including 13 FIFA World Cup qualifying matches. His debut occurred on 18 January 1995 in a friendly with Spain, as he came on as a half-time substitute for Ruben Alzueta in a 2–2 draw in A Coruña; he did not, however, attend any major international tournament.

Previously, Tais participated at the 1991 FIFA World Youth Championship, as the national under-20s scored no goals and conceded seven in Portugal.

References

External links

National team data 

1972 births
Living people
Footballers from Montevideo
Uruguayan footballers
Association football defenders
Uruguay international footballers
Uruguay under-20 international footballers
Uruguayan Primera División players
La Liga players
Peñarol players
Danubio F.C. players
Miramar Misiones players
Racing de Santander players
Real Betis players
Uruguayan expatriate footballers
Expatriate footballers in Spain
Uruguayan expatriate sportspeople in Spain